ISO 3166-2:SH is the entry for Saint Helena, Ascension and Tristan da Cunha in ISO 3166-2, part of the ISO 3166 standard published by the International Organization for Standardization (ISO), which defines codes for the names of the principal subdivisions (e.g., provinces or states) of all countries coded in ISO 3166-1.

Currently for Saint Helena, Ascension and Tristan da Cunha, ISO 3166-2 codes are defined for 3 geographical entities.

Each code consists of two parts, separated by a hyphen. The second part is two letters.

Ascension Island and Tristan da Cunha, previously dependencies of Saint Helena but raised to equal status in 2009, are exceptionally reserved the ISO 3166-1 alpha-2 codes  and  respectively on the request of the Universal Postal Union.

Current codes
Subdivision names are listed as in the ISO 3166-2 standard published by the ISO 3166 Maintenance Agency (ISO 3166/MA).

Click on the button in the header to sort each column.

Changes
The following changes to the entry have been announced in newsletters by the ISO 3166/MA since the first publication of ISO 3166–2 in 1998:

Codes deleted in ISO 3166-2:2007
In the first edition of ISO 3166-2, the following codes were defined for 1 administrative area and 2 dependencies, but they are no longer defined since the second edition (ISO 3166-2:2007, published on 2007-12-13).

See also
 FIPS region codes of Saint Helena

External links
 ISO Online Browsing Platform: SH
 Dependencies of Saint Helena, Statoids.com

2:SH
Saint Helena, Ascension and Tristan da Cunha